This is a list of satirical news websites which have a satirical bent, are parodies of news, which consist of fake news stories for mainly humorous purposes.

Definition
The best-known example is The Onion, the online version of which started in 1996.  These sites are not to be confused with fake news websites, which deliberately publish hoaxes in an attempt to profit from gullible readers.   News satire is a type of parody presented in a format typical of mainstream journalism, and called a satire because of its content. News satire is not to be confused with fake news that has the intent to mislead. News satire is popular on the web, where it is relatively easy to mimic a credible news source and stories may achieve wide distribution from nearly any site.

List

Defunct
 The Daily Currant
 Faking News
 Southend News Network

See also

Satirical news
 News satire
 List of satirists and satires
 List of satirical magazines
 List of satirical television news programs

Related topics
 Confirmation bias
 Court of public opinion
 Filter bubble
 Selective exposure theory
 Sensationalism
 Spiral of silence
 Trial by media

Notes

References

 
Satirical news